Bill Schwab (born 1959) is an American photographer known for his emotionally charged yet peaceful urban and natural landscapes.

Born in Detroit, Michigan he received a Bachelor of Fine Arts degree from Central Michigan University in 1983.

Schwab's career as a photographer and publisher now spans over 4 decades with work in many private, corporate and museum collections around the world including The Art Institute of Ohio – Cincinnati, Detroit Institute of Arts and the George Eastman House. He has been a pioneer in the area of online representation and branding of his photographic art having successfully managed a worldwide collector base for many years as well as consulted with other artists and galleries on the subject. In addition to his work as a photographer, through his North Light Photographic Workshops, he facilitates classes in several photographic process a year at his northern Michigan facility as well as leads expeditions of photographers to Iceland, the Faroe Islands and more. Bill is also founder and host of the "Photostock Festival", an annual gathering of photographers, collectors and enthusiasts for workshops, reviews, presentations and demos.

Having been shown in many group and solo exhibitions in the US and abroad since the early 1980s, Schwab's work continues to become more widely known and sought after.

Photo books 
 Bill Schwab: Photographs (North Light Press, 1999 )
 Gathering Calm: Photographs 1994 - 2004  (North Light Press, 2005 )
 Belle Isle  (North Light Press, 2011 )
 Waterside (North Light Press, 2013 )

External links 
 Schwab's site
 Detroit Metro Times
 RfotoFolio - Seeing the Beauty - The Photographs of Bill Schwab
 LenScratch Magazine - Bill Schwab: Belle Isle
 Bill Schwab's New Work Captures City's Twilight
 Bill Schwab's Detroit: Where We Used to Live
 aCurator Magazine
 Winter Garden Photograph Project
 The Northern Express - Bill Schwab: Mysteries of Light
 Photostock Festival
 North Light Photographic Workshops

1959 births
American photographers
Living people
Artists from Detroit
Central Michigan University alumni